Briercrest College and Seminary is a private evangelical post-secondary educational institution located in Caronport, Saskatchewan, Canada. It comprises a college and a seminary, and operates the Briercrest Christian Academy.

History
Its precursor was a home Bible study in the village of Briercrest, Saskatchewan, which grew to include several members of the community. Eventually the group formed a new church, the Briercrest Gospel Assembly. The people needed a pastor to lead the church and wanted to open a Bible school.

Henry Hildebrand was a student at Winnipeg Bible Institute and a circuit riding preacher with Canadian Sunday School Mission (CSSM). Sinclair Whittaker, one of the believers at Briercrest, was a businessman and a former Conservative member of the provincial legislature. He contacted Henry, informing him of their need for a pastor and their desire to open a Bible school. Eventually Hildebrand agreed to join them at Briercrest.

Briercrest Bible Institute opened its doors on October 19, 1935, with 11 students enrolled. A rented house served as dormitory, classroom, and office for the school. Hildebrand was principal and Annie Hillson, Isabel Whittaker, Jean Whittaker, and Margaret Rusk helped with teaching and administration. Donald McMillan joined them in the second term as assistant principal.

By 1946, they had outgrown their facility, and Whittaker arranged the purchase of RCAF Station Caron (a former British Commonwealth Air Training Plan facility which trained aircrew in World War II) for $50,000. The new facility was dedicated on July 1, 1946, and the task of converting the airbase into dormitories, classrooms, offices, and staff housing began.

Briercrest Christian Academy, formerly Caronport High School opened in September 1946. A grade school also began that year. Enrolment grew in all of the schools and many new buildings were constructed to accommodate the growing student body. In the early 1970s, the schools began to recognize the need for academic credibility. Briercrest became a candidate for accreditation with the Accrediting Association of Bible Colleges (now the Association for Biblical Higher Education) in 1973, and became accredited in 1976. The school was given authority to grant degrees in 1974. In 1979, a distance learning program was launched. In 1982, the name Briercrest Bible Institute was changed to Briercrest Bible College. The seminary began in 1983, and receive accreditation from the Association of Theological Schools in 1998.

College enrolment grew from 285 in 1970 to 775 in 1985 and peaked in 2002 with 869 students in the College and 247 in the Seminary, before changing names to Briercrest College in 2003. More recently, enrolment has been in decline. As of 2019, enrolment at Briercrest Christian Academy (formerly Caronport High School) is at 141 students, Briercrest College has 489 students, and Briercrest Seminary with 286 students.

The decline in student enrolment has also caused financial instability with a budget deficit of $2.17 million in 2019, $2.26 million in 2018 and $1.18 million in 2017.

Academics

Briercrest College and Seminary offers one-year certificates, Associate of Arts degrees, Bachelor of Arts, Master of Arts, and Master of Divinity degrees. Each program includes courses in Bible and theology, Christian ministry, liberal arts, and the social sciences along with many electives. The college has been accredited by The Association for Biblical Higher Education since 1976. The Government of Saskatchewan authorizes Briercrest to grant degrees in "Bachelor of Arts in English/English (Honours)", "Bachelor of Arts in History/History (Honours)", Bachelor of Arts in Psychology, and "Bachelor of Arts in Humanities". A number of other programs are currently grandfathered in and will have until 2020 to meet quality assurance criteria under the province's 2012 Degree Authorization Act. The seminary is accredited by the Association of Theological Schools. The seminary employs a modular format (typically one course in one week) for most of its courses.

Briercrest also offers distance learning courses at both the college and seminary levels.

The college is associated with the Saskatchewan Institute of Applied Science and Technology (SIAST) and has transfer agreements with the universities of Regina and Saskatchewan.

In early 2011 Briercrest and Minot State University announced a partnership allowing students to complete a Bachelor of Arts degree and a Bachelor of Science in Education degree from both schools in five years. The program requires students to complete their Bachelor of Arts degree during the first three years at Briercrest college and the final two at Minot State earning the Education degree. Minot State offers five different concentrations for its B.S.E. As such a students completing this program may select earning a Bachelor of Science in:
Elementary Education
English
History
Music
Physical Education

Briercrest also offers other concurrent degrees with Minot State University such as:

Addiction Studies
Communication Disorders
Social Work

Student life

The majority of Briercrest College students live in residence and participate in a school meal plan in a dining hall operated by Sodexo. Unmarried students aged 22 years and under (as of the first semester of the school year) in their first three years of study are required to live in residence while enrolled.

The college dormitories have a history of being named after people who have had significant impact throughout the history of the schools.  Current dormitories at Briercrest include:

Isabel Whittaker (women), known as "Whit"
Sinclair Whittaker (men), known as "Whit"
Hillson Hall (men, high school)
Glen Manor (women, high school)
Bergren Place (women)
Eliason Manor (men) built in 2005
Sundbo Place (married students, women, and men over 21 years of age)

The last of the war-building dormitories, known most recently as Gable Heights, was demolished in summer 2005.

The college explicitly bans the consumption of alcohol and tobacco by its students (both on and off campus) as well as using profanity, watching pornography, or cross-dressing. Social dancing is also not permitted except at college-sponsored events. The college also prohibits students from engaging in premarital sex or engaging in homosexuality. The school mandates attendance at daily chapel services and other events. These and other expectations are outlined in the Student Responsibilities and Expectations manual.

Facilities
The campus landmark is the 2,000-seat Hildebrand Chapel. Facilities also include a  library, nine student dormitories, a 42-room inn, a modern dining hall, a double-court gymnasium, a hockey arena, tennis courts, numerous sports fields, and a recording studio.

During the year of 2020-21, the gas station/coffee shop formerly known as "The Point", was acquired by new ownership and underwent renovations to open as "The Beacon". This newly renovated facility consists of a Husky gas station, Subway, and Coffee Shop while also having space for students and townsfolk to come to view acactv streams of the school's various sports teams or purchase athletics apparel to show support.

As of September 2021, the campus features a brand new Athletics facility. This is the Can West Performance Center that consists of; artificial turf, various workout equipment, a film room, and an athletic therapy room.

Athletics
Briercrest College and Seminary's athletic teams are known as the Clippers. Varsity sports include men's and women's basketball and volleyball, and men's hockey. They compete in the Alberta Colleges Athletic Conference, part of the Canadian Colleges Athletic Association. They also have Junior Varsity teams for men's and women's basketball, volleyball, and outdoor soccer that compete in the Prairie Athletic Conference. Briercrest also has a club women's softball team that plays in the Western Collegiate Softball Association. Court sports play in the Margaret P. Reimer Memorial Gymnasium and the hockey team plays in Barkman Arena, named in honour of past president and current chancellor John Barkman. The 500-seat NHL-sized rink officially opened on February 7, 2009.

Briercrest teams have medaled in CCAA national championships four times, winning its only gold at the 1977 Men's Basketball Championship, silver at the 1991 Men's Basketball Championship, bronze at the 2012 Men's Volleyball Championship and silver at the 2014 Men's Volleyball Championship. The school has produced one CCAA National Player of the Year (Gradyn Childerhose, men's Basketball, 2012), three CCAA Coach of the Year recipients, (Carl Hinderager, men's Basketball, 1983; Stan Peters, men's Basketball, 1993; and Nigel Mullan, men's volleyball, 2012) and numerous CCAA All-Canadians.

In 2019-20, three Clippers Women's Volleyball players earned ACAC All-Conference awards: Rebecca Garner (Outside Hiitter), Mikayla Benterud (Middle Blocker), and Ashley Erickson (Setter). Erickson was also named Player of the Year for the ACAC South. Women's Volleyball Coach, Nolan Weinmaster won ACAC Coach of the Year for the South Conference. The Women's Basketball team also received an award with Angenay Williams getting a 1st Team All-Conference nod. Men's Volleyball teammates, Bryton Codd and Karym Coleman (both Outside Hitters), were named to the ACAC South All-Conference Team. Coleman also won ACAC Player of the Year. Brandon Tolentino was the sole Men's Basketball player to get an award as he made 2nd Team All-Conference.
 
In 2021-22, Briercrest sent their Men's Basketball, Men's Hockey, Men's Volleyball, and Women's Volleyball teams to the Alberta Colleges Athletic Conference (ACAC) playoffs. The Men's Volleyball team medaled with a third place finish, defeating The King's University Eagles in the Bronze medal game in a tight five-set match. In addition to sending four out of five teams to the ACAC playoffs during the 2021-22 winter season, there were also numerous ACAC awards handed out to Clipper athletes. Reece Sorensen made the ACAC Women's Volleyball All-Conference team for the South as an Outside Hitter, and Faith Buhler made it as a Middle Blocker. Briercrest Women's Volleyball Head Coach, Nolan Weinmaster, also brought home some hardware as he was awarded the Coach of the Year for the ACAC South Conference. Brady Watchel made the ACAC Men's Volleyball All-Conference Team as a Libero, and Karym Coleman made it as an Outside Hitter. Coleman was also awarded as the ACAC Men's Volleyball Player of the Year. Coleman also won the award in 2019-20 before the 2020-21 athletic season was cancelled due to COVID-19. 

Briercrest hosted the 1993 CCAA Women's Basketball Championships on campus and the 2014 CCAA Men's Volleyball Championships at the Yara Centre in Moose Jaw, Saskatchewan.

CCAA National Championships
Men's Basketball (1) (1977)

ACAC Championships
Men's Volleyball (1) (2011)
Women's Volleyball (2) (2016, 2020)

PAC Provincial Championships
Men's Basketball (19) (1970, 1971, 1972, 1973, 1975, 1976, 1977, 1978, 1979, 1980, 1981, 1982, 1983, 1989, 1990, 1991, 1992, 1993, 1995)
Women's Basketball (7) (1981, 1989, 1991, 1992, 1993, 1994, 1995)
Men's Volleyball (12) (1970, 1976, 1977, 1984, 1985, 1986, 1987, 1989, 1990, 1991, 1992, 2018)
Women's Volleyball (8) (1982, 1987, 1988, 1989, 1990, 1991, 1992, 2017)
Men's Ice Hockey (2) (1971, 1980)
Men's Indoor Soccer/Futsal (1) (2010)
Women's Indoor Soccer/Futsal (3) (2000, 2005, 2006)
Men's Outdoor Soccer (4) (2006, 2009, 2017, 2018)
Women's Outdoor Soccer (5) (2006, 2009, 2017, 2018, 2019)

Presidents
Throughout its history, Briercrest has had six presidents: Henry Hildebrand (1935–1977); Henry Budd (1977–1990); John Barkman (1990–1996); Paul Magnus (1996–2004); Dwayne Uglem (2004–2013); and Michael Pawelke (2013–present) — Sinclair Whittaker served as president of the board until 1950.

Histories of the College
 Budd, Henry. Wind in the Wheatfields: A Pictorial History of Briercrest Bible College, 1935-1985. Caronport, SK: Briercrest Bible College, 1985.
 Hildebrand, Henry. In His Loving Service. Caronport, SK: Briercrest Bible College, 1985.
 Palmer, Bernard and Marjorie Palmer. Beacon on the Prairies: The Men God Uses in the Building of Briercrest Bible Institute. Caronport, SK: Briercrest Bible Institute, 1970.
 Palmer, Bernard. Miracle on the Prairies: The Story of Briercrest Bible Institute. Caronport, SK: Briercrest Bible Institute, [1960?].

References

External links
 

Association for Biblical Higher Education
Educational institutions established in 1935
Colleges in Saskatchewan
Bible colleges
Evangelical seminaries and theological colleges in Canada
1935 establishments in Saskatchewan
Seminaries and theological colleges in Canada